This is a list of islands of Jamaica. There are about 49 islands in the island nation of Jamaica. All islands are in the Caribbean Sea.

Islands
The islands of the country of Jamaica include:

Bajo Nuevo Bank (uninhabited), 
Bare Bush Cay, 
Big Half-Moon Cay, 
Big Pelican Island, 
Big Portland Cay, 
Blake Cay
Blower Rock, 
Bogue Islands (Bog Islands), 
Bolt Cay
Booby Cay, 
Booby Cay - Negril
Booby Cay - Pedro Cays
Booby Cay - Pedro Cays
Booby Cay - Morant Cays
Bush Cay, 
Bushy Cay
Cabarita Island, 
Careening Cay, 
Christmas Island
Dolphin Island, 
Drunken Man's Cay
East Crall
Emerald Island, 
Fort Island, 
Gordon Cay
Great Goat Island, 
Green Cay
Green Island, 
Gun Cay, 
Hogsty Cay, 
Jamaica, 
Lilyroot Cay, 
Lime Cay, 
Little Goat Island, 
Little Half-Moon Cay, 
Little Pelican Island, 
Little Portland Cay
Long Island, 
Maiden Cay, 
Man O' War Cays
Mango Cay, 
Mid Crall
Middle Cay, 
Morant Cays, 
Morant Bank
Navy Island, 
Needles
Northeast Cay - Morant Cays, 
Northeast Cay - Pedro Cays, 
One Tree Island
Pedro Bank, 
Pelican Cay
Pellen Island (Pellew Island or Monkey Island), 
Pigeon Island, 
Portland Rock, 
Rackhams Cay, 
Refuge Cay, 
Rocky Cay
Salt Island, 
Sandbank Cay
Sandals Royal Caribbean Resort & Offshore Island (Sandals Cay), 
Santamaria Island, 
Sapphire Island
Short Island
South Cay, 
Southeast Cay - Port Royal Cays (uninhabited), 
Southeast Cay - Morant Cays
Southwest Cay - Pedro Cays
Southwest Rock
Tern Cay, 
West Crall
Woods Island,

See also

List of Caribbean islands
Geology of Jamaica

References

 List of islands of Jamaica
Jamaica